Actinodendron is a genus of cnidarians belonging to the family Actinodendridae.

Species

Species:

Actinodendron alcyonoideum 
Actinodendron arboreum 
Actinodendron glomeratum 
Actinodendron hansingorum 
Actinodendron plumosum

References

Actinodendridae
Hexacorallia genera